The Karachi War Cemetery was created to receive World War II dead from cemeteries scattered across the country, as it was felt that their proper maintenance could not be assured.

In 2016, British Deputy High Commissioner Ms Belinda Lewis, Defence Adviser Brigadier Murray Whiteside and British Naval and Air Adviser Group Captain John Alexander attended the Remembrance Service at the Karachi War Cemetery.

World War II graves
All the graves (642) are from World War II. There are numerous recipients of Mention in Dispatches (MiD) and Distinguished Service Order (DSO), three recipients of the coveted Military Cross (MC), as well as one listed with Member of the Order of the British Empire (MBE) and three with the Order of the British Empire (OBE).

Remains shifted from other places
Some remains of soldiers and other personnel who died during World War II and later between 1945 and 1947, were shifted from the following towns in Pakistan, by the Commonwealth War Graves Commission (CWGC) and the British Council:
 Old Christian Cemetery, Abbottabad
 Jhelum Christian Cemetery

Notable burial
Major Walter John Clare Duncan of Somerset, who belonged to the 12th Frontier Force Regiment Guides Cavalry has a DSO and Bar with MC.

Maintenance
The CWGC is responsible for its upkeep. It employs 4 people on site: 3 gardeners and a supervisor.

References

External links
 Commonwealth War Graves Commission (CWGC)
 Indian Cemeteries
 

Cemeteries in Karachi
World War II cemeteries
Commonwealth War Graves Commission cemeteries in Pakistan